Khomyakov may refer to: 
Aleksey Stepanovich Khomyakov, a Russian religious philosopher
Alexander Petrovich Khomyakov, a Russian mineralogist
Nikolay Khomyakov (1850-1925), Russian politician

Russian-language surnames